The muscle-type nicotinic receptor is a type of nicotinic acetylcholine receptor consisting of the subunit combination (α1)2β1δε (adult receptor) or (α1)2β1δγ (fetal receptor). These receptors are found in neuromuscular junctions, where activation leads to an excitatory postsynaptic potential (EPSP), mainly by increased Na+ and K+ permeability.

Activation 
Tetraethylammonium (TEA) is a molecule found to be a weak agonist of the muscle‐type nicotinic receptor. Since receptor activation occurs as isolated bursts, it has been proposed that the receptors have a very low channel‐opening rate constant when bound to TEA.

Inhibition 
Lidocaine, a local anesthetic, has multiple inhibitory actions on the receptor and analysis of the structure of lidocaine has identified the presence of a hydrophobic aromatic ring and a hydrophilic terminal amine. Diethylamine (DEA), a molecule that mimics the hydrophilic moiety of lidocaine by way of a positively charged amine, has been found to block the channel when the receptor is open restricting the flow of Na+ and K+ ions. 2,6-Dimethylaniline (DMA), a molecule that mimics the hydrophobic moiety of lidocaine, has been found to bind the receptor at inter-subunit crevices of the trans-membrane spanning domain thereby causing non-competitive inhibition and restricting the channel from opening.

Benzocaine and tetracaine are also local anesthetics that have an inhibitory effect on the muscle‐type nicotinic receptor. Benzocaine is a permanently uncharged species that inhibits the receptor by plugging the pore of the opened channel. Tetracaine is a permanently positively charged species. It can bind to the receptor at different sites in both the open and closed conformations. Both of these local anesthetics enhance nAChR desensitization.

Ligands

Agonist 

 Acetylcholine

Partial Agonists 

 Carbachol
 Suxamethonium

Antagonists 

 α-Bungarotoxin
 α-Conotoxin
 Hexamethonium
 Pancuronium
 Tubocurarine

See also 
 Nicotinic acetylcholine receptor
Ganglion type nicotinic receptor

References 

Nicotinic acetylcholine receptors